David Morley may refer to:
 David Morley (barman) (1967–2004), English barman and murder victim
 David Morley (administrator) (born 1954), British diplomat
 David Morley (poet) (born 1964), British poet
 David Morley (swimmer) (born 1965), Bahamian swimmer
 Dave Morley (born 1977), English footballer
 David Morley, partner of international law firm Allen & Overy
 David Morley (musician) (born 1965), electronic musician
 David Morley (writer) (born 1962), British writer and radio producer
 David Morley (paediatrician) (1923–2009), British pioneer in children's health care
 David Hatton Morley (1746–1810), British coffee house keeper

See also
 David Mobley (disambiguation)